is the third single by J-pop group Yoshimotozaka46. The single was released on 25 December 2019. The title track features Naoto Ikeda and Mari Kotera at the center position.

Release 
The single was released as three versions: DVD, Type A, and Type B. The DVD edition contained four B-sides and was also bundled with a DVD containing the music video of "Funō dewa Irarenai" and "Stray Sheep". Type A contained three B-sides, the last of which is unique; Type B did not have any B-sides.

Track listing 
All lyrics written by Yasushi Akimoto.

DVD edition

Type A

Type-B

Charts performance
Oricon

Billboard Japan

References

2019 singles
2019 songs
Japanese-language songs
Yoshimotozaka46 songs